Mr. Logan, U.S.A. is a lost 1918 silent film western directed by Lynn F. Reynolds and starring Tom Mix. It was produced and distributed by Fox Film Corporation.

Also known as Jim Logan, U. S. A..

Cast
 Tom Mix - Jim Logan
 Kathleen O'Connor - Suzanne Morton
 Dick La Reno - Uncle Billy Morton
 Charles Le Moyne - Jim Crosby
 Jack Dill - Olsen
 Val Paul - J. Alexander Gage, aka Meier
 Maude Emory - Dolly Dugan
 Jack Curtis - Actor (unbilled)

References

External links
 
 

1918 films
1918 Western (genre) films
Lost Western (genre) films
Films directed by Lynn Reynolds
Fox Film films
Lost American films
American black-and-white films
1918 lost films
Silent American Western (genre) films
1910s American films